Oliver Dimitrioski (born 31 January 1972) is a Macedonian handball coach. He coached RK Metalurg Skopje and serves as the Head Coach of youth national team of Macedonia 2 years (2015, 2017) at the international handball tournament.

Career

Player 

 HC Tutunski Kombinat-Prilep
 HC Struga-Struga 
 HC Kumanovo - Kumanovo
 IFC Nykoping – Nykoping -Sweden
 HC Gostivar - Gostvar
 HC Jug - Skopje
 HC Pegasus - Prilep

Coach 

 IFC Nykoping senior team women 1992/1994
 HC Pegasus senior team men 1998/2000
 HC Prilep senior team men 2002/2004
 HC Metalurg youth team 2008/2011
 HC Metalurg junior team 2011/2014
 HC Metalurg 2 senior team 2014/2017
 HC Prilep senior team 2017/18
 HC Metalurg senior team assistant coach 2018/19
 HC Metalurg senior team head coach 2018/19 (play off)
 HC Macedonia youth national team (2015, 2017)

Results 

 CUP winner of Macedonia -2018/19
 First place (U 16 Metalurg) – 2018/19
 Winner of the Master de Grenoble France – 2019
 First place Winter Skopje CUP tournament - 2019
 First place international tournament - Ilinden CUP 2018
 Best coach in Macedonia (junior) –2015/16
 First place (junior Metalurg) –2015/16
 First place (youth Metalurg) - 2014/15
 Third place (junior Metalurg) - 2014/15

References

Macedonian male handball players
Macedonian handball coaches
1972 births
Living people